Denis Kozhukhin (born in Nizhny Novgorod, 1986) is a Russian pianist who was awarded third prize in the 2006 Leeds International Piano Competition. He was also awarded first prize in the 2010 Belgian Queen Elisabeth Competition for piano.

Recordings 
Franck - Symphony in D Minor & Symphonic Variations. Gustavo Gimeno, Denis Kozhukhin, Orchestre Philarmonique Luxembourg. PENTATONE PTC 5186771 (2020)
Grieg & Mendelssohn - Piano Works. PENTATONE PTC 5186734 (2019)
Richard Strauss - Burleske/Ein Heldenleben. Marc Albrecht, Denis Kozhukhin, Netherlands Philharmonic Orchestra. PENTATONE PTC 5186617 (2018).
Maurice Ravel and George Gershwin - Piano Concertos. Kazuki Yamada, Orchestre de la Suisse Romande. PENTATONE PTC 5186620 (2018).
 Brahms - Ballades & Fantasies. PENTATONE PTC 5186568 (2017)
 Tchaikovsky & Grieg Piano concertos. Rundfunk-Sinfonieorchester Berlin/Vassily Sinaisky. PENTATONE PTC 5186566 (2016)
 Joseph Haydn. Piano sonatas,  Onyx ONYX4118 (2014)
 Prokofiev, Piano Sonata No. 6, No. 7 and No. 8. Onyx ONYX4111 (2013), debut album.

References

External links
 Denis Kozhukhin at  Albéniz Foundation, Biblioteca Virtual Miguel de Cervantes
 Kim wins the 'Leeds' at BBC
 Denis Kozhukhin at Argerich Foundation
 Denis Kozhukhin at Intermusica

Russian classical pianists
Male classical pianists
1986 births
Living people
Reina Sofía School of Music alumni
Prize-winners of the Leeds International Pianoforte Competition
21st-century classical pianists
21st-century Russian male musicians
Prize-winners of the Queen Elisabeth Competition